Renée Lawless-Orsini (born November 30, 1960) is an American actress and singer. She is best known for starring as the bitter and distant matriarch, Katheryn Cryer, in the  Oprah Winfrey Network prime time soap opera The Haves and the Have Nots.

Life and career
Lawless was born in Knoxville, Tennessee, and moved with her family to Jacksonville in at age 19 and graduated from Sandalwood High School, Stetson University, and University of Cincinnati – College-Conservatory of Music. She began singing in church and school plays and later in regional theater. As of the mid 1990s she appeared primarily in stage productions, like national touring of Beauty and the Beast, and Wicked for five years.

In 2013, Lawless began starring as Katheryn Cryer in the Oprah Winfrey Network prime time soap opera The Haves and the Have Nots.

Filmography

Film

Television

References

External links
 
 

Living people
1960 births
American musical theatre actresses
American stage actresses
American television actresses
American soap opera actresses
People from Knoxville, Tennessee
Actresses from Atlanta
Stetson University alumni
University of Cincinnati – College-Conservatory of Music alumni
21st-century American women